George Breitman (February 28, 1916 – April 19, 1986) was an American communist political activist and newspaper editor. He is best remembered as a founding member of the Socialist Workers Party (SWP) and as a long-time editor of that organization's weekly paper, The Militant. Breitman also supervised and edited several important publishing projects as the head of the SWP's publishing house in the 1960s and 1970s.

Biography

Early years

George Breitman was born February 28, 1916, in a working-class neighborhood of Newark, New Jersey, the son of Benjamin Breitman, an iceman, and his wife Pauline Trattler Breitman. He attended public school in Newark. Upon graduation from Newark Central High School, Breitman was employed in the ranks of the Civilian Conservation Corps. He later found a job working in the New Deal's Works Progress Administration.

Political career

Breitman returned to Newark in 1935 and joined the Trotskyist movement as a member of the Spartacus Youth League, the youth section of the Workers Party of the United States (WPUS). He joined the adult WPUS that same year. He also of  became involved in the unemployed movement of the period as a leading activist in the New Jersey Workers Alliance.

Breitman followed the Workers Party into the Socialist Party of America in the middle 1930s, before leaving to become a founding member of the Socialist Workers Party in December 1937.

He was elected to the SWP's governing National Committee for the first time in 1939 and served continuously in that position until 1981. He was also frequently a member of the party's Political Committee, which handled day-to-day operations of the organization.

In 1940, Breitman married Dorothea Katz (1914–2004).

He was four times the SWP's candidate for the United States Senate for New Jersey, running in 1940, 1942, 1948, and 1954.

Following the departure of Max Shachtman and his political associates to form a new Workers Party, Breitman was named editor of the SWP's weekly paper, The Militant. He held that post from 1941 until 1943, when he found himself drafted into the U.S. Army and sent to France. In March 1946 he participated in the first post-war conference of the Fourth International, held in Paris. He was arrested at this meeting along with other participants but quickly released, owing to his American citizenship.

After the war, Breitman was once again named editor of The Militant, handling primary editorial duties from 1946 to 1954. During this time, he wrote copiously, publishing over 500 articles in The Militant from 1947 to 1955.

In 1954, the Breitmans moved to Detroit, where for the next 13 years they served as District Organizers for the SWP. There George and Dorothea Breitman helped to organize the "Friday Night Socialist Forum" (later called the "Militant Labor Forum"), a weekly lecture series that attracted participants a broad range of activists from labor, radical, and black liberation groups. To pay the bills, Breitman worked as a printer and proofreader for the Detroit Free Press. As such, he was a member of the International Typographical Union.

Breitman returned from Detroit to New York in the late 1960s to take over management of  the SWP's publishing arm, Pathfinder Press. In that capacity, he served as editor of a 14-volume collection entitled Writings of Leon Trotsky, 1929–1940, which was published from 1969 to 1979. During his time at the helm of Pathfinder, Breitman was instrumental in the publication of various collections of writings by SWP leading light James P. Cannon and a pioneering selection of writings by Malcolm X, entitled Malcolm X Speaks (1965).

Although politically a child of the 1930s, Brietman was deeply influenced by the radical movements of the 1960s and 70s seeing them as a harbinger of a coming social revolution which he prophesied would have a "combined character" being both a socialist revolution of the working class against capitalism merged with the struggles and demands of "specially oppressed" people: Blacks, Latinos and other nationally oppressed people; women, gays and others, groups Brietman pointed that were, like the American population in general, overwhelmingly working class.  Brietman described the radical movements of that period as constituting a "New Radicalization"
that was deeper and broader than the ones he described as occurring before the Civil War among abolitionists and small farmers and later among industrial workers and socialists during the turn of the century in the era of the Bolshevik Revolution up through the 1930s.  He thus saw that it portended the prospect of a great social upheaval.  In a certain sense he adopted and translated into Old Left and orthodox Marxist terms, New Leftist ideas.  For this he was denounced as a Herbert Marcuse like revisionist by sectarian Marxists,  while others viewed his ideas as entirely correct, even visionary, which explored the issues Marcuse addressed on a deeper level, reconciling them with revolutionary Marxism, whose adherents, in the words of Lenin, must at all times be "tribunes of the people" responding to every manifestation of tyranny and oppression.

In the late 1970s Breitman opposed what he saw as a growing fixation of the SWP's top leadership on the Castroist leadership of the Cuban Communist Party, and  became involved in a factional opposition group in the SWP beginning in 1981. This disagreement over the direction ultimately led to Breitman's expulsion from the SWP in 1984.

Despite ill health, Breitman played a leading role in the foundation of the Fourth Internationalist Tendency, which sought to unify U.S. supporters of the Fourth International. Continuing his editorial activities, he was a contributing editor of the group's journal, Bulletin in Defense of Marxism.

Breitman used several pseudonyms over the course of his life, including most famously "Albert Parker," but also ""Philip Blake," "Drake," "Chester Hofla," "Anthony Massini," "John F. Petrone," and "G. Sloane."

Death and legacy
Breitman died of a heart attack on April 19, 1986, in New York City.

Breitman's papers are held by the Tamiment Library at New York University. The Breitman papers, consisting of 30 linear feet of material collected in 63 archival boxes, is open for use by scholars without restriction.

Footnotes

Works

 The Trenton Siege by the Army of Unoccupation. Introduction by John Spain, Jr. Trenton, NJ: Workers Alliance of America, n.d. [1936].
 The Fight Against Hagueism: A Program of Action. (Unsigned.) Newark, NJ: Socialist Workers Party, New Jersey District, 1938.
 Defend the Negro Sailors on the U.S.S. Philadelphia. As "Albert Parker." New York: Pioneer Publishers, 1940.
 New Jersey in the 1940 Elections. (Unsigned.) Newark, NJ: Socialist Workers Party, 1940.
 The March on Washington One Year After. As "Albert Parker." New York: Pioneer Publishers, 1942.
 The Struggle for Negro Equality. As "Albert Parker," with John Saunders. New York: Pioneer Publishers, 1943.
 Wartime Crimes of Big Business. New York: Pioneer Publishers, 1943.
 The Jim Crow Murder of Mr. and Mrs. Harry T. Moore. New York: Pioneer Publishers, 1952.
 Anti-Negro Prejudice: When It Began, When It Will End. New York: Pioneer Publishers, 1960.
 How a Minority Can Change Society: The Real Potential of the Afro-American Struggle. New York: Young Socialist Forum, 1964. —Reissued 1971 by Pathfinder Press.
 Malcolm X: The Man and His Ideas. New York: Pioneer Publishers, 1965.
 Marxism and the Negro Struggle: Articles by Harold Cruse, George Breitman, Clifton DeBerry. With Harold Cruse and Clifton DeBerry. New York: Monad Press, 1965.
 The Last Year of Malcolm X: The Evolution of a Revolutionary. New York: Merit Publishers, 1967.
 Black Nationalism and Socialism. New York: Merit Publishers, 1968.
 Myths About Malcolm X: Two Views. With Albert Cleage. New York: Merit Publishers, 1968.
 The Rocky Road to the Fourth International, 1933-38. New York: Pathfinder Press, 1979.
 Malcolm X and the Third American Revolution: The Writings of George Breitman. Anthony Marcus, ed. New York: Humanity Books, 2005.

External links 

 Wolfgang and Petra Lubitz, "George Breitman," Lubitz TrotskyanaNet, 2009. —Biographical sketch and a select bibliography. 
 George Breitman Internet Archive. Marxists Internet Archive. Retrieved March 18, 2010.
 George Breitman Audio. Marxists Internet Archive:
 "Lecture on the Negro Movement."
 "The Marxist Theory on the Negro Struggle." In 9 parts.
 "What a Minority Can Do." Speech to 1964 Conference of the Midwest Young Socialist Alliance. In 5 parts.
 Guide to the George Breitman Papers 1928-1986. Tamiment Library, New York University. Retrieved March 18, 2010.

Further reading

 Naomi Allen and Sarah Lovell (eds.) A Tribute to George Breitman: Writer, Organizer, Revolutionary. New York: Fourth Internationalist Tendency, 1987.
 New Jersey in the 1940 Elections. Newark, NJ: Socialist Workers Party, 1940. — ''Rare penny pamphlet by Breitman for his Senate campaign.

1916 births
1986 deaths
20th-century American male writers
20th-century American newspaper editors
20th-century American politicians
American Marxists
American Trotskyists
United States Army personnel of World War II
American socialists
Malcolm X
Members of the Socialist Party of America
Members of the Workers Party of the United States
New Jersey socialists
Socialist Workers Party (United States) politicians from New Jersey
Works Progress Administration workers
Writers from Newark, New Jersey